Pennsylvania Route 28 (PA 28) is a major state highway which runs for  from Anderson Street in Pittsburgh to U.S. Route 219 (US 219) in Brockway in Pennsylvania. From Pittsburgh to Kittanning it is a  limited access expressway named the Alexander H. Lindsay Memorial Highway or the Allegheny Valley Expressway.

Route description

PA 28 begins adjacent to Downtown Pittsburgh at Anderson Street near the Interstate 279 (I-279)/I-579 interchange and travels north/northeast along the northern bank of the Allegheny River. Until recently the route was a surface street for the first  until the 40th Street Bridge and then an expressway from 40th Street to Kittanning. Upgrades in 2013 made it a limited-access highway throughout its  in the Pittsburgh metropolitan area from the route's start at I-279 to Rayburn Township, Armstrong County, with Governor Tom Corbett attending the completion ceremony on November 17, 2014.

In Etna, PA 28 interchanges with Pennsylvania Route 8 at exit 5 before departing the Blue Belt, which PA 28 is part of from I-279/I-579 to this point, at exit 6 near Aspinwall. Near Harmar Township, PA 28 meets Pennsylvania Route 910 at exit 11 which provided access to Interstate 76 (the Pennsylvania Turnpike). From exit 11 to U.S. Route 422 west of Kittanning, PA 28 has eight interchanges, including exits with Pittsburgh Mills Boulevard (exit 12A), Pennsylvania Route 366 (exit 14), and Pennsylvania Route 356 (exit 17), while continuing to parallel the Allegheny to the east. Exit 18 consists of Pennsylvania Route 128 crossing or which used to be old 28 before the expressway. At exit 19, PA 28 merges with the limited-access US 422 and heads east along US 422 as it proceeds south of West Kittanning.

Upon crossing the Allegheny River and entering Kittanning, US 422 and PA 28 interchange with Pennsylvania Route 66. PA 66 then joins the concurrency for two miles (3 km) to an exit with U.S. Route 422 Business southeast of downtown Kittanning. Here, US 422 leaves the freeway and heads east toward Indiana while PA 28 and PA 66 remain concurrent as they progress northward.

The  freeway ends with a concurrency with Pennsylvania Route 66. In Rayburn Township, PA 28/PA 66 intersects the western terminus of Pennsylvania Route 85. After PA 85, PA 28/PA 66 head towards the northeast. In South Bethlehem, PA 28/PA 66 become North Street and Broad Street then intersecting the northern terminus of Pennsylvania Route 839.

After crossing Redbank Creek, PA 28/PA 66 enters Clarion County and New Bethlehem. In downtown New Bethlehem, PA 66 splits off from PA 28 and making the PA 28/PA 66 concurrency one of the longest concurrencies in Pennsylvania. After the split, PA 28 heads northeast as Broad Street paralleling Redbank Creek. In Hawthorn, PA 28 is called Brookville Street and meets the western terminus of Pennsylvania Route 536. North of PA 536, PA 28 begins to slide to the north instead of the northeast.

In Summerville, PA 28's course begins to slide towards the northeast again and in Summerville, PA 28 is called Harrison Street. In Clover and Rose townships, PA 28 parallels many railroads tracks that even cross it. In Brookville, PA 28 has a wrong-way concurrency with U.S. Route 322 and Pennsylvania Route 36. The reason of the wrong-way concurrency is that PA 28 is heading north while PA 36 is heading south on the concurrency with US 322. In downtown Brookville, PA 36 splits off from US 322/PA 28. Then after crossing North Fork Creek, US 322/PA 28 meet the southern terminus of the former Pennsylvania Route 968. East of here, US 322 splits off from PA 28 at a "T" interchange. East of Brookville in Pine Creek Township, PA 28 intersects Interstate 80 at exit 81 a diamond interchange. PA 28 passes through the many wildlife in Pennsylvania through a forest region. In Brockway, PA 28 is called Main Street before terminating (ending) at a "T" intersection with U.S. Route 219.

History

The highway was signed in 1927 from Pittsburgh to Kittanning. It is named after Alexander Lindsay, a lawyer who lived in South Buffalo and commuted to work in Pittsburgh: he successfully lobbied for the city to be connected to the proposed Keystone Shortway (I-80). 

The highway was extended north to Brockway in 1928.  In 1928, the route was under construction from Blawnox to Cheswick, Troy Hill Road to Oakland, and Hazen to Reitz Crossing Road.  Those sections were completed the following year.  In 1929, the section from Avella to Woodrow and from Hickory to Fort Cherry Road was under construction and finished the following year.  In 1930, the section from Skyline Road to PA 18 was paved as well as in Venice.  That year the western terminus was moved from Avella to Independence.

In 1958, the highway was widened and a median installed at the interchange with the Turnpike.  On July 15, 1960, the highway's southern terminus was moved from Independence to PA 8 in Etna.  The former section of PA 28 from South Main Street in the West End Valley to the intersection of Noblestown Road and Crafton Boulevard in Crafton Heights was redesignated as PA 60.  The remaining 83-mile stretch from Crafton Heights to Independence was renumbered PA 50. This designation change was made to reduce the number of concurrent routes in Pittsburgh. The changes took effect a few months later and signs were changed by spring 1961.

In 1963, this section opened to traffic from PA 8 north to the Highland Park Bridge interchange and the following year to Blawnox. Full interchanges would be constructed at both bridges; however, this recommendation was not carried out. It also laid out a plan that would turn PA 28 into an expressway from Pittsburgh to Brookville, this too was not carried out.

In 1964, the highway was widened and a median installed on it between Brackenridge and the Butler County line.  In 1968, construction began on the section from Blawnox to PA 910.  The expressway was proposed from that point to the Butler County line.  Construction also began on the section from Slate Lick to near Center Hill in the same year.  In 1965, the route was moved from Courthouse Road into Kittanning to bypass the borough on its current alignment.  In 1969, construction commenced on the section from PA 910 to Exit 12 and from Exit 16 to PA 356 and the Armstrong County line.

The start of the 1970s saw the construction extend from Exit 16 all the way to a new expressway alignment for US 422, also under construction, near West Kittanning.  In 1971, construction commenced on the section from Exit 15 to Exit 16.  In 1972, the expressway opened to traffic from Blawnox to PA 910 and from Exit 15 to US 422.  However, PA 28's designation was not placed on the section from Exit 15 to Exit 16.  The following year, the expressway opened from PA 910 to Exit 12.

In 1973, the route was extended to end at US 19/PA 65 at Chateau Street via Western Avenue and East Ohio Street.

In 1975, construction commenced on the section from Exit 12 to north of Tarentum; during the following year, the construction was extended to Exit 15.  In 1978, the PA 28 designation was routed onto the newly opened highway from Exit 11 to Exit 12 and from Exit 15 to Exit 16.  The PA 28 designation still followed Freeport Road to connect between Exit 12 and Exit 15.

In 1980, the expressway opened from Exit 12 to Exit 13 and the PA 28 designation was moved onto this section.  In 1984, the route was changed to follow Western Avenue, Allegheny Avenue, North Shore Drive, General Robinson Street, and Madison Avenue for northbound traffic, and Reedsdale Street for southbound traffic in Pittsburgh.  The final section of the Allegheny Valley Expressway between Exit 13 and Exit 15 opened in 1985. During the 1980s, through traffic in each direction at the Highland Park Bridge interchange was reduced to one lane due to heavy demand for the bridge itself.

In 2011, the southbound lanes of PA 28 were shifted to bypass the intersection of the 40th Street Bridge, while the northbound lanes remained under the bridge. In 2012, an excavation lowered the roadbed of PA 28 at the 31st Street Bridge.

Though technically limited access for its first two miles near downtown Pittsburgh since the 2012 construction, all lanes were clear of lane closures and construction by November, 2014 when Governor Tom Corbett attended the official groundbreaking ceremony to celebrate all 44.5 miles being expressway-grade. The widening included a small park with a promenade and a retaining wall which features several murals on the city's history, including that of the Saint Nicholas Croatian Catholic Church on the aforementioned structure's site.

On December 12, 2017, PennDOT announced that they planned on widening PA 28 at the Highland Park interchange to have two through lanes on each side while having a designated exit and entrance lanes for the bridge, with work scheduled to start in 2020 with some residual work lasting into 2021. The only other thing keeping PA-28 from having the possibility of receiving an interstate designation are the 45-mph speed limits near the Millvale and Etna Exits, as well as the section of the southbound one-lane expressway between Exit 9 (Blawnox Exit), and Exit 8,(Waterworks Exit). If these are ever to be upgraded to Interstate Highway standards, PA 28 will be up to Interstate Highway standards from its southern terminus all the way to Kittanning, and could potentially receive an Interstate designation in the future.

Major intersections

PA 28 Truck

Pennsylvania Route 28 Truck is a  truck route in Brookville, Jefferson County, Pennsylvania. As Route 28 travels through the Brookville city center, it becomes a narrow main street and features a relatively sharp turn just west of the bridge over North Fork Creek. As a result, after the completion of Interstate 80, Route 28's truck traffic was shifted onto this freeway bypass from Exit 78 at Pennsylvania Route 36 (which Truck 28 is cosigned for its first 1/2 mile of existence) to Exit 81, where Route 28 meets the highway.

See also

References

External links

 Pennsylvania Highways: PA 28

028
Limited-access roads in Pennsylvania
Freeways in the United States
Transportation in Allegheny County, Pennsylvania
Transportation in Armstrong County, Pennsylvania
Transportation in Butler County, Pennsylvania
Transportation in Clarion County, Pennsylvania
Transportation in Jefferson County, Pennsylvania